Hunter Water is a state owned corporation providing drinking water, wastewater, recycled water and some stormwater services to 500,000 people in the Lower Hunter Region in New South Wales, Australia. It was formed in 1892, when the Hunter District Water Supply and Sewerage Board was founded, and was later known as the Hunter District Water Board between 1938 and 1992.

Dams and catchments
Hunter Water supplies its customers with water sourced from Chichester Dam located north of Dungog and Grahamstown Dam located east of Raymond Terrace. It also utilises water from underground aquifers at the Tomago Sandbeds in Tomago.

References

Companies based in Newcastle, New South Wales
Government-owned companies of New South Wales
Hunter Region
Water companies of New South Wales
1892 establishments in Australia